The Journal of Heat and Mass Transfer Research is a semiannual peer-reviewed open-access scientific journal published by Semnan University and the editor-in-chief is Syfolah Saedodin (Semnan University). The journal covers all aspects of research on heat and mass transfer. It was established in 2014 and is indexed and abstracted in Scopus.

References

External links

Energy and fuel journals
Biannual journals
Creative Commons Attribution-licensed journals
English-language journals
Publications established in 2014